Furse Khola is a tributary of the Seti Gandaki River in Pokhara, Nepal. It joins the Seti Gandaki to the south of Pokhara International Airport.

References 

Rivers of Gandaki Province